Richard Maguet (7 March 1896, Amiens – 16 June 1940, Sully-sur-Loire) was a French Post-Impressionist painter.

Biography 
He was born to a middle-class family of modest means. His first trip to Paris came in 1913.  There, with a recommendation from the sculptor Albert Roze, he studied in the workshops of the designer, who became one of his best friends. Two years later, he was conscripted and fought at the Battle of Verdun, for which he was awarded the Croix de Guerre. He was demobilized in 1919, returned to Paris,  worked as a printer and, a year later, got married.

After that, he provided illustrations and cartoons for several newspapers, as well as doing costume designs. He also had his first solo exhibitions at the Salon d'Automne and the Salon des Indépendants. In the late 1920s, he made several stays in Yonne (notably at Cravant) and Boulogne-sur-Mer, with his friends  and Jean Launois.

In 1930, he was named Secretary of the Salon d'Automne. Two years later, he toured Southern France and visited Algiers, where he stayed at the Villa Abd-el-Tif; one of the benefits of having been awarded the Prix Abd-el-Tif, together with the sculptor .

Shortly after returning, his wife, Lucienne, died of a heart attack. To help assuage his grief, he spent a year travelling throughout Algeria and Morocco. In 1935, he went back to Paris and married Denise Titre, a great-granddaughter of Elisée Reclus. She published a monograph of him as a wedding gift.

In 1939, he enlisted in the Army and was assigned to a Spahi regiment. The following year, he was killed in a bombing raid by the Italian Air Force that destroyed Sully-sur-Loire. He was buried at a memorial cemetery in Saint-Père-sur-Loire. His tombstone was designed by his friend, Damboise.

Selected paintings

References

Further reading 
 Richard Maguet: 1896–1940 (exhibition catalog), Centre Alban-Minville (Toulouse), 1976, with criticism by Albert Camus.

External links

Richard Maguet website, with criticisms, letters and galleries.

1896 births
1940 deaths
20th-century French painters
20th-century French male artists
French landscape painters
Post-impressionist painters
People from Amiens
Recipients of the Croix de Guerre 1914–1918 (France)
Deaths by airstrike during World War II
French Army personnel
French military personnel of World War II
French military personnel killed in World War II